Year 1059 (MLIX) was a common year starting on Friday (link will display the full calendar) of the Julian calendar.

Events 
 By place 

 Byzantine Empire 
 November 22 – Emperor Isaac I Komnenos falls ill on a hunt and retires to a monastery after a 2-year reign. He abdicates the Byzantine throne and appoints Constantine X, a Paphlagonian nobleman, as his successor.
 Fall – The Magyars cross the Danube River, together with several Pecheneg tribes, but are halted by Byzantine forces (approximate date).

 Europe 
 Peter Krešimir IV (the Great) is crowned king of Croatia and Dalmatia. His coronation is recognised by the Byzantine Empire who confirm him as the supreme ruler of the Dalmatian cites, i.e. over the Theme of Dalmatia – excluding the theme of Ragusa and the Duchy of Durazzo.
 August 23 – Robert Guiscard, count of Apulia and Calabria, signs the Treaty of Melfi with Pope Nicholas II. Nicholas recognises the Norman conquest of southern Italy and accepts the titles of Guiscard as duke of Sicily.

 Seljuk Empire 
 Alp Arslan succeeds his father Chaghri Beg as governor of Khorasan. He crosses with a Seljuk expeditionary force the upper Halys River and plunders the Theme of Sebasteia (modern Turkey).

 By topic 

 Religion 
 January 24 – Pope Nicholas II succeeds Stephen IX as the 155th pope of the Catholic Church. He is installed in Rome in opposition to Antipope Benedict X – the brother of the late Pope Benedict IX (deposed in 1048).
 April 13 – Nicholas II, with the agreement of the Lateran Council, issues the papal bull In nomine Domini, making the College of Cardinals the sole voters in the papal conclave for the election of popes.

Births 
 At-Turtushi, Andalusian political philosopher (d. 1126)
 Fujiwara no Akinaka, Japanese nobleman (d. 1129)
 Fulcher of Chartres, French priest and chronicler
 Henry I, count of Limburg and Arlon (approximate date)
 Ngok Loden Sherab, Tibetan Buddhist monk (d. 1109)
 Raynald I, French nobleman and abbot (d. 1090)
 Robert of Burgundy, bishop of Langres (d. 1111)

Deaths 
 April 4 – Farrukh-Zad, Ghaznavid sultan (b. 1025)
 June 29 – Bernard II, German nobleman
 July 7 – Abdallah ibn Yasin, Almoravid ruler
 August 14 – Giselbert, count of Luxembourg
 Cathal mac Tigernán, king of Iar Connacht
 Eilika of Schweinfurt, German noblewoman
 Michael I (Cerularius), Byzantine patriarch
 Michael VI (Bringas), Byzantine emperor
 Peter Orseolo (the Venetian), king of Hungary
 Vyacheslav Yaroslavich, prince of Smolensk

References